The 1896–97 season was Stoke's eighth season in the Football League.

After last season's success of finishing in 6th position there was high hopes that it would signal a change in the club's fortunes. Alas it was a disappointing season for Stoke as little progress was made and they finished the season in 13th position with 25 points.

Season review

League
As the 1896–97 season beckoned there was a lot of talk of Stoke purchasing the football pitch at the cricket ground in the town, with a considerable amount of financial backing promised. However this never materialised much to the disappointment of chairman Mr S. Barker. During the campaign itself a total of 16 players made their senior debuts for the club including Zeke Johnston, Stoke's first Irishman signed from Burnley. There was little progress in the league with a 13th-place finish. The best result of the season saw Stoke beat Liverpool 6–1 in February 1897. Long serving forward Billy Dickson retired as did half-back Davy Brodie.

FA Cup
After beating Glossop 5–2 in the first round Stoke lost 2–1 in the next to Preston North End.

Final league table

Results

Stoke's score comes first

Legend

Football League First Division

FA Cup

Squad statistics

References

Stoke City F.C. seasons
Stoke